Albert Reed may refer to:
Albert Reed (model) (born 1985), American model
Albert Reed (cricketer) (1846–1931), English cricketer
Albert Edwin Reed (1846–1920), founder of the publishers Reed Elsevier
Albert Reed Jr. (1910–1986), American actor and law enforcement officer

See also
Bert Reed (born 1988), American football wide receiver
Albert Reid (disambiguation)
Albert Read (disambiguation)